Juana Rosa Aguirre Luco (November 20, 1877 – December 8, 1962) was First Lady of Chile (between December 25, 1938- November 25, 1941) and the wife of President Pedro Aguirre Cerda, who was also her cousin.

Biography
She was the daughter of the popular doctor José Joaquín Aguirre Campos and his second wife Mercedes Luco Gutiérrez. She and Pedro Aguirre Cerda were married in 1916, but they never had children. She became the First Lady of Chile in 1938 when her husband assumed the presidency.

She was greatly committed to education, was popular with the public, and was a supporter of women's participation in politics in Chile.

After the death of her husband from tuberculosis in 1941, she established in his memory the Pedro Aguirre Cerda Children's Home Foundation to care for abandoned children.

References 

1877 births
1963 deaths
First ladies of Chile
Chilean people of Basque descent